Yunnanilus ganheensis is a species of freshwater ray-finned fish, a stone loach in the genus Yunnanilus. The type locality is Ganhe in Xundan County in Yunnan and the specific name refers to that location.

References

G
Taxa named by An Li
Taxa named by Liu Bai-Song
Taxa named by Li Wie-Xian
Fish described in 2009